Oligia modica, the black-banded brocade, is a species of cutworm or dart moth in the family Noctuidae. It is found in North America.

The MONA or Hodges number for Oligia modica is 9404.

References

Further reading

External links

 

Oligia
Articles created by Qbugbot
Moths described in 1852